Jamka may refer to the following places :

 Jamka State, a former princely state, and the village it comprised, on Saurashtra peninsula, in Gujarat, western India
 Stara Jamka, a village in Opole Voivodeship, in south-western Poland